Vasile Ioan Lucaci (born January 5, 1969) is a former Romanian rugby union player and currently one of CSM Baia Mare's coaches. He played as a prop.

International career
Lucaci was a member of Romania for the third Rugby World Cup held in 1995.

References

External links
Vasile Ioan Lucaci International Statistics

1969 births
Living people
Romanian rugby union players
Rugby union props
Romania international rugby union players
People from Maramureș County